Šandor Hodik (born 21 September 1965) is a Serbian-Macedonian handball player of ethnic Hungarian descent.

Club career
Over the course of his career that spanned over 35 years, Hodik played for numerous teams, most notably Pelister. He also had multiple spells at both Jugović and Vojvodina. After playing for Sloga Doboj of Bosnia and Herzegovina, Hodik returned to Serbia and helped Kolubara win the national cup in the 2008–09 season.

In March 2019, six months shy of his 54th birthday, Hodik came out of retirement to help his former club Kikinda in the Serbian Handball Super League. He would play for his parent club Potisje Ada in the 2019–20 season.

International career
While playing for Pelister, Hodik accepted a call-up to represent Macedonia, making his major debut at the 1998 European Championship. He also participated in the 1999 World Championship.

Honours
Pelister
 Macedonian Handball Super League: 1997–98
 Macedonian Handball Cup: 1997–98, 1998–99
Vojvodina
 Serbia and Montenegro Handball Super League: 2004–05
 Serbia and Montenegro Handball Cup: 2004–05
Kolubara
 Serbian Handball Cup: 2008–09

References

External links
 MKSZ record
 

1965 births
Living people
Yugoslav people of Hungarian descent
Serbian people of Hungarian descent
Yugoslav male handball players
Serbia and Montenegro male handball players
Serbian male handball players
Macedonian male handball players
RK Jugović players
RK Vojvodina players
RK Proleter Zrenjanin players
RK Kolubara players
Expatriate handball players
Serbia and Montenegro expatriate sportspeople in North Macedonia
Serbia and Montenegro expatriate sportspeople in Hungary
Serbian expatriate sportspeople in Bosnia and Herzegovina